This is a list of fellows of the Royal Society elected in its fifth year, 1664.

Fellows 
Sir Robert Atkyns (1647–1711)
Nicholas Bagenall (1629–1712)
Charles Boyle (1639–1694)
Gilbert Burnett (1643–1715)
James Carkesse (1657–1675)
Sir Winston Churchill (1620–1688)
John Cutler (1608–1693)
Joseph Glanvill (1636–1680)
Sir William Godolphin (1635–1696)
John Hay (1626–1697)
John Hervey (1616–1680)
Johannes Hevelius (1611–1687)
James Hoare (1620–1696)
Sir John Lowther (1642–1706)
Henry More (1614–1687)
Thomas Neale (1641–1699)
John Newburgh (1630–1692)
Sir William Portman (1643–1690)
Thomas Rolt (1641–1672)
Sir Nicholas Slanning, 1st Baronet (1643–1691)
Edward Smith (fl. 1664–1668)
Thomas Thynne (1640–1714)
Isaacus Vossius (1618–1689)
Roger Williams (d. 1665)
Samuel Woodford (1636–1700)

References

1664
1664 in science
1664 in England